Tilen Bartol (born 17 April 1997) is a Slovenian ski jumper.

Career 

Bartol made his World Cup debut on 29 December 2015 at the Four Hills Tournament in Oberstdorf, where he finished 47th.

On 16 March 2016, he fell at Planica ski flying hill test event at 252 metres (827 ft). The distance would be a world record without falling.

World Cup

Standings

Individual starts

References

External links 

1997 births
Living people
Sportspeople from Kranj
Slovenian male ski jumpers
Olympic ski jumpers of Slovenia
Ski jumpers at the 2018 Winter Olympics
21st-century Slovenian people